William Warner (born 1806) was a Michigan politician.

Early life
Warner was born in 1806 in Connecticut.

Career
Warner moved from Connecticut and settled on a farm in Dexter, Michigan in 1824. Warner also worked in the lumber and hardware businesses. On November 5, 1850, Warner was elected to the Michigan House of Representatives where he represented the Washtenaw County district from February 5, 1851 to 1852.

References

1806 births
People from Dexter, Michigan
Farmers from Michigan
Republican Party members of the Michigan House of Representatives
19th-century American politicians
Year of death missing